Dean Rader is an American writer and professor who teaches at the University of San Francisco, in the Department of English, where he has also served as department chair. Rader holds a M.A.and Ph.D. in comparative literature from the State University of New York at Binghamton where he studied translation, poetry, visual culture, and literary studies. He is primarily known for his poems that mix high and low art and his scholarly work on Native American poetry.

"Self Portrait as Wikipedia Entry" was published in 2017 by Copper Canyon Press, and the title poem also posted on ZYZZYVA on February 6, 2012. The book was a finalist for the Oklahoma Book Award and the Northern California Book Award and received positive reviews from The San Francisco Chronicle, Publishers Weekly, Booklist, and The Rumpus.

Rader published two other books in 2017, including a collection of poems co-written with Simone Muench, entitled Suture (Black Lawrence Press), also known as the "Frankenstein Sonnets." He also edited Bullets into Bells: Poets & Citizens Respond to Gun Violence (with Brian Clements & Alexandra Teague), which was published by Beacon Press. This book contains 50 poems by American poets, and each poem is paired with a response by a survivor of a shooting, a community activist, or a leader in the gun violence prevention movement. Widely praised, Bullets into Bells was recognized by The New York Times, The Washington Post, PBS, Poets & Writers, Rain Taxi, and other publications.

Literary work 
In addition to his teaching, Rader is a published reviewer, a scholar of film and art, and an award-winning poet. His poem "Hesiod in Oklahoma, 1934" won the Sow's Ear Review poetry prize in 2009, judged by Kelly Cherry. Rader's debut poetry collection, Works and Days, won the 2010 Truman State University T. S. Eliot Poetry Prize, judged by Claudia Keelan. Works & Days was also named a finalist for the Bob Bush Memorial First Book Award, and it won the Writer's League of Texas Book Award for Poetry.

Rader's 2014 collection, Landscape Portrait Figure Form (Omnidawn 2014), a book that explores the connection between poetry and painting, was named by the Barnes & Noble Review as one of the year's Best Books of Poems. He was also the recipient of the George Bogin Memorial Award from the Poetry Society of America. Harvard poet and critic Stephen Burt selected a folio of Rader's poems entitled "American Self-Portrait" for the 2015 award.

In 2011, Rader wrote a series of columns for the San Francisco Chronicle on The 10 Greatest Poets, which received media coverage in The New York Times.

That same year, Rader began a blog called 99 Poems for the 99 Percent, which posted 99 poems over 99 days. The blog featured poems by well-known writers like LeAnne Howe, Matthew Zapruder, Robert Pinsky, Martha Collins, Heid Erdrich, Edward Hirsch, Timothy Donnelly, Maxine Chernoff, Camille T. Dungy, and Bob Hicok as well as beginning and non-professional poets. In 2014, 99 Poems for the 99 Percent: An Anthology of Poetry, was published in book form. In August, it debuted at number two on the Small Press Distribution Poetry Bestseller List and in September, it took over the number one spot.

Rader is reported to be at work on an anthology of Native American Poetry and is writing a book of poems about the painter Cy Twombly.

Other awards and fellowships 
 Fellowships at Harvard University and Princeton University
 Guggenheim Fellowship in Poetry, 2019
 Appearance in Best American Poetry and Best of the Net
 Poetry prizes from The Poetry Society of America, Crab Orchard Review, Common Ground Review, 2007
 National Endowment for the Humanities Chair at the University of San Francisco, 2009–2010.
 Editor, Studies in American Indian Literature

Works

Poetry
"Self-Portrait as Wikipedia Entry" (Copper Canyon Press, 2017)
"Suture" (Black Lawrence Press, 2017)
"Bullets into Bells: Poets & Citizens Respond to Gun Violence' (Beacon Press, 2017)
"Landscape Portrait Figure Form" (Omnidawn, 2014)
"99 Poems for the 99 Percent: An Anthology of Poetry (99: The Press, 2014)
"Works & Days" (T.S. Eliot Prize, Truman State University Press, 2010)

Books

Online 
 "Frost on Fire" in THE NEW YORK TIMES, poem
 "Sphere of Influence or Praise Song for the Warriors", a poem commissioned by THE SAN FRANCISCO CHRONICLE
 "America We Do Not Call Your Name Without Hope" in THE SAN FRANCISCO CHRONICLE, poem
 "History", poem in The Kenyon Review
 99 Poems for the 99 Percent, blog

References

External links 
 
 "Dean Rader", University of San Francisco
 "Dean Rader", Copper Canyon Press Author Page
 "Review of Works & Days", Poetry Flash
 "Dean Rader", Guggenheim Foundation Profile

Year of birth missing (living people)
Living people
American male poets
Harvard Fellows
University of San Francisco faculty
Binghamton University alumni
Princeton University fellows
21st-century American poets
21st-century American male writers